The Moisie River is a river in eastern Quebec. Known as the Nahanni of the East, it is a wild river of North America. 
It has been proposed to protect the river with the Moisie River Aquatic Reserve.

Course

The Moisie River basin lies between the basins of the Rapides River to the west and the Matamec River to the east.
The Moisie flows south from Lake Opocopa near the Labrador border to the north shore of the Saint Lawrence River east of Sept-Îles, Quebec. The town of Moisie is located at its mouth. The length calculated from most commonly used starting point of canoe trips, bridge of highway 389 over Pékans River (at 
) is 373 km.

Moisie tributaries include: 
 Aux Pékans River
 Carheil River (via Pékans)
 Nipissis River
 Caopacho River
 Ouapetec River
 Joseph River

Name

The river's name may originate from a French word moisie meaning "moldy" . But this is not certain and other hypotheses exist.

The Mishta-shipiunnu ("Innu from the Moisie River") call it Mishta-shipu ("Great River"; mishau - ″big, great″ and shipu - ″river").
As they have done for thousands of years, they continue to use the river to reach their northern hunting and fishing grounds. Large parts of the river were also protected by private fishing clubs. There were recent attempts to develop hydroelectric projects on the Moisie. However, in 2003, the Quebec government protected a large part of the river's watershed as an aquatic reserve. This prevents activities such as logging, mining and power projects, but permits traditional uses such as hunting and fly-fishing.

Environment

A map of the Ecological regions of Quebec shows the river's tributary, the Rivière aux Pékans, rising to the northwest of Fermont just west of the Spruce/lichen domain of the boreal zone, and flowing south through the eastern spruce/moss domain.
The last section of the Moisie River flows through the Fir/white birch domain of the boreal zone.

This river is the most important spawning ground for the Atlantic Salmon in eastern North America.

Usage

The Moisie River is popular with experienced canoeists concerning its whitewater. It flows through a deep valley of glacial origin. The width of the valley varies considerably, at the spout of the river the valley is very narrow, and wider in areas that are not obstructed by rapids. The views of mountains and cliffs cause it to be used for canoe camping. The Quebec North Shore & Labrador Railway follows the lower section of the Moisie River and provides access to the Quebec-Labrador plateau from which canoeists can reach its headwaters. Because of its remote proximity, there are very few access points to the river and if an accident were to occur with a canoeist the most common form of salvation is by floatplane. Yet in still, because of the narrow valley some canoeist much travel kilometres until they can reach a spot for a plane to land. The Railway crosses the river at the last whitewater rapid on the river, which is also the largest, and most well known. These rapids have been named train tracks because of their close proximity to the Railway above. There was a forest fire in the Summer of 2014 which destroyed a lot of the ecosystem surrounding the river and made it unsafe for campers and canoeists to explore and venture. The Moisie River is very remote and has very few inhabitants. You can see few cabins along the river.

See also

List of Quebec rivers

References

Sources

Sept-Îles, Quebec
Rivers of Côte-Nord